The Harmonie Municipale Differdange de la Ville de Differdange (HMDifferdange) is a classical music ensemble, founded on 17 July 1884 in Differdange, Luxembourg.

Conductors

References

External links  

 (in German)

Luxembourgian musical groups